Sorana is a village in the municipality of Pescia in the province of Pistoia in Tuscany, Italy.
In 1994, it had 300 inhabitants. The area is known for its production of the Sorana bean. 

Sorana is one of the Ten Castella in the local area known as the Valleriana and nicknamed . The other castelle are Aramo, Castelvecchio, Fibbialla, Medicina, Pietrabuona, Pontito, San Quirico, Stiappa, and Vellano, plus an eleventh, Lignana, which is in ruins. The castella villages are built from pietra serena stone.

References 

Province of Pistoia